Newton is a city in and the county seat of Newton County, Texas, United States.  The population was 1,633 at the 2020 census.

History

Both Newton County and its county seat, Newton, were named after John Newton, a supposed hero of the American Revolutionary War. However, John Newton's heroics are said to be a product of Parson Weems, who also fictionalized the story of George Washington and the cherry tree. In 1853, disputes led to the building of a courthouse and town in the county's geographical center instead of in Burkeville, a community 11 miles north northeast of Newton. A second courthouse in Newton, a Second Empire style structure, was built in 1902–1903 with bricks from nearby Caney Creek, according to a Texas Historical Commission marker. The town was incorporated in 1935 and remains the only incorporated city in the county. The town's public school began when the W.H. Ford Male and Female College was chartered in 1889. The site of the college later became the Powell Hotel and now serves as a museum and houses the city's chamber of commerce. The growth of the city during the first half of the 20th century was largely due to the dominant timber industry in East Texas. The town had at least one newspaper prior to 1920s.

The county courthouse, a focal point of a city square that featured extensive Christmas lighting in the early 1990s, was severely damaged by a fire in August 2000. Various funding and other problems pushed back the timeframe for the restoration of the interior for years. The historic building finally reopened in December 2012.

Although almost 80 miles from the Gulf of Mexico, Newton suffered extensive damage in September 2005 from Hurricane Rita. The National Weather Service estimated wind gusts in the vicinity of Newton to be between 80 mph to 100 mph. Some residents were without electricity for one month.

Geography

Newton is located at  (30.850397, –93.754149).

Demographics

As of the 2020 United States census, there were 1,633 people, 796 households, and 539 families residing in the city.

At the 2000 census there were 2,459 people, 731 households, and 508 families living in the city. The population density was 446.9 people per square mile (172.6/km). There were 900 housing units at an average density of 163.6 per square mile (63.2/km).  The racial makeup of the city was 59.78% White, 31.60% African American, 0.08% Native American, 1.10% Asian, 0.04% Pacific Islander, 6.02% from other races, and 1.38% from two or more races. Hispanic or Latino of any race were 12.28%.

Of the 731 households 35.7% had children under the age of 18 living with them, 49.9% were married couples living together, 16.8% had a female householder with no husband present, and 30.5% were non-families. 28.9% of households were one person and 13.7% were one person aged 65 or older. The average household size was 2.54 and the average family size was 3.12.

The age distribution was 23.9% under the age of 18, 13.8% from 18 to 24, 31.4% from 25 to 44, 17.7% from 45 to 64, and 13.1% 65 or older. The median age was 33 years. For every 100 females, there were 129.4 males. For every 100 females age 18 and over, there were 138.3 males.

The median household income was $26,667 and the median family income  was $31,250. Males had a median income of $28,571 versus $18,542 for females. The per capita income for the city was $11,416. About 25.0% of families and 27.4% of the population were below the poverty line, including 35.1% of those under age 18 and 17.6% of those age 65 or over.

Education
The City of Newton is served by the Newton Independent School District and home to the Newton High School Eagles.

Climate
The climate in this area is characterized by hot, humid summers and generally mild to cool winters.  According to the Köppen Climate Classification system, Newton has a humid subtropical climate, abbreviated "Cfa" on climate maps.

Notable people

 Todd Gilbert, Speaker of the Virginia House of Delegates (2021–Present)
James Gulley (born 1965), professional basketball player for Ironi Ramat Gan in the Israeli Basketball Premier League
Sam Force Collins—  (June 9, 1928 – November 3, 2021) was an American politician. He served as a Democratic member in the Texas House of Representatives from 1959 to 1964.

References

External links
 City of Newton Website

Cities in Texas
Cities in Newton County, Texas
County seats in Texas
Populated places established in 1853
1853 establishments in Texas